Jérémy Labor (born 19 March 1992) is a French professional footballer who plays for Championnat National 2 club Toulon. Traditionally a centre-back, he can also be utilized on the side. He is a former France youth international, having represented his nation at under-18 and under-19 level.

Club career
Labor was a member of the Monaco under-19 team that won the 2010–11 edition of the Coupe Gambardella and made his professional debut on 19 November 2011 in a Coupe de France match against Alès. A week later, he made his league debut in a 2–0 defeat to Nantes. In July 2013, he joined Belgian side RWDM Brussels along with his teammate Martin Sourzac on a loan deal.

References

External links
 
 
 
 
 

Living people
1992 births
French footballers
Association football central defenders
France youth international footballers
AS Monaco FC players
R.W.D.M. Brussels F.C. players
S.V. Zulte Waregem players
Entente SSG players
Red Star F.C. players
SC Toulon players
Ligue 2 players
Championnat National players
Championnat National 2 players
Belgian Pro League players
Challenger Pro League players
French expatriate footballers
French expatriate sportspeople in Belgium
Expatriate footballers in Belgium
French expatriate sportspeople in India
Expatriate footballers in India